The 10th Annual Indonesian Movie Actor Awards was an awards ceremony held on May 30, 2016, at the Studio 14 RCTI, West Jakarta. The show was hosted by Daniel Mananta and Nirina Zubir on awarding night, and Tara Budiman and Ayushita on red carpet. Nominations in the category of "Favorite" were chosen by members of the public via SMS, and in the category of "Best" by an appointed jury.

Mencari Hilal led the nominations with nine, with 3, A Copy of My Mind, Guru Bangsa: Tjokroaminoto, Surat Dari Praha, and Toba Dreams followed with six nominations each. In the night ceremonies, Mencari Hilal was the biggest winner, receiving four awards and Toba Dreams each won two awards.

A special award, Lifetime Achievement Award was presented to Widyawati for her outstanding contribution to Indonesian cinema industry.

In 2016, the edition of this ceremony awards has winning the award for Favorite Special Events at the 19th Annual Panasonic Gobel Awards.

Judges

Performers

Presenter 
 Chicco Jerikho and Chelsea Islan – Presented Best Children Role
 Dewi Sandra and Zaskia Adya Mecca – Presented Best Newcomer Actor/Actress
 Dimas Anggara and Prisia Nasution – Presented Favorite Newcomer Actor/Actress
 Hannah Al Rashid and Melayu Nicole Hall – Presented Favorite Supporting Actor
 Arifin Putra and Julie Estelle – Presented Best Supporting Actor
 Dion Wiyoko and Hamish Daud – Presented Favorite Supporting Actress
 Ario Bayu and Fachri Albar – Presented Best Supporting Actress
 Tanta Ginting and Tora Sudiro – Presented Best Chemistry
 Vino G. Bastian – Presented Favorite Actress
 Marsha Timothy – Presented Favorite Actor
 Ray Sahetapy and Reza Rahadian – Presented Lifetime Achievement Award
 Bunga Citra Lestari – Presented Best Actress
 Joe Taslim and Tara Basro – Presented Best Actor
 Adinia Wirasti and Dian Sastrowardoyo – Presented Favorite Film
 Lukman Sardi and Sheila Timothy – Presented Best Ensemble

Winners and nominees

Best
Winners are listed first and highlighted in boldface.

Favorite
Winners are listed first and highlighted in boldface.

Film with most nominations and awards

Most nominations

The following film received most nominations:

Most wins
The following film received most nominations:

Awards and nominations

References

External links
 Official website IMAA 2016

Indonesian
2016 in Indonesia
Indonesian Movie Actor Awards